Valentin Vasilyevich Balakhnichev (born 23 April 1949) is a Russian engineer and athletics coach and a former president of the All-Russia Athletic Federation. After investigations into corruption involving performance enhancing drug testing, Balakhnichev was banned for life by the IAAF.

Biography
Balakhnichev was an athlete for the Soviet Union, taking third place in the 110 metres hurdles at the 1973 national championships and representing his country at the 1973 European Indoor Championships. He retired as an active athlete in 1976 a year after receiving his degree from Moscow Power Engineering University and began his career as a coach. He was the Soviet national coach from 1978-1984. He has since earned a PhD and is a doctor of sciences in theory and methodology of physical education and sports training.

Since 1991 he has been president of the All-Russia Athletic Federation. He is also a member of the Council for Physical Culture and Sport under President of the Russian Federation and a member of the Executive Committee of the Russian Olympic Committee. He has held the positions of Vice-Minister of Sport of the Russian Federation Positions in the International Sports Organizations, Vice-President, European Athletic Association, on the IAAF Marketing & Promotion Commission since 1997, a member of the council of the International Association of Athletics Federations since 2007 and Treasurer.

Balakhnichev resigned his role as IAAF Treasurer amid allegations from the German broadcaster ARD that the world body is investigating a systematic doping scandal and coverup in Russia. Among the allegations was that Liliya Shobukhova, the second fastest marathoner in history paid $450,000 to avoid a doping ban. She was eventually banned, annulling her results back to 2009. Also under Balakhnichev's watch is the Saransk based program of Viktor Chegin, who has had at least 30 of his athletes banned for doping offenses, including Olympic and world champions Elena Lashmanova and Valeriy Borchin.

References

1949 births
Soviet male hurdlers
Russian male hurdlers
Russian referees and umpires
Athletics (track and field) administrators
Russian athletics coaches
Living people